Hebburn is a town in the metropolitan county of Tyne and Wear, England. It governed under the borough of South Tyneside; formerly governed under the county of Durham until 1974 with its own urban district from 1894 until 1974. It is on the south bank of the River Tyne between Gateshead and Jarrow and opposite Wallsend and Walker. 

The population of Hebburn was 18,808 in 2001,

History

In Saxon times Hebburn was a small fishing hamlet upon the river Tyne. It is thought that the name Hebburn may be derived from the Old English terms, heah meaning "high", and byrgen meaning a "burial mound", though it could also mean the high place beside the water. The first record of Hebburn mentions a settlement of fishermen's huts in the 8th century, which were burned by the Vikings.

In the 14th century the landscape was dominated by a peel tower. A  wall, a portion of which still remains at St. John's Church, could also be seen. The Lordship of the Manor of Hebburn passed through the hands of a number of families during the Middle Ages, including the Hodgsons of Hebburn (James 1974, Hodgson).

In the early 1600s, the wealthy Newcastle family, the Ellisons, acquired the land of Hebburn. Coal was mined at Hebburn as early as the 17th century. In 1792 the Ellisons received royalties from coal mining expansion when Hebburn Colliery opened. The colliery eventually operated three pits. In 1786 the Ellisons’ Hebburn estate also made income from dumping ships ballast at Hebburn Quay. By the 1800s the Ellison family had expanded Hebburn Manor into their Hebburn Hall estate. Hebburn Colliery played an important role in the investigations into the development of mine safety, following the mining disaster at Felling Colliery in 1812. 

Humphry Davy stayed with Cuthbert Ellison at Hebburn Hall in 1815 and took samples of the explosive methane 'fire damp' gas from the Hebburn mine which were taken to London in wine bottles for experiments into the development of a miners' safety lamp. Davy's lamps were tested in the Hebburn mine and remarkably the gauze that protected the naked flames could actually absorb the fire damp so that the lamps could shine more effectively.

In 1853, Andrew Leslie arrived from Aberdeen, Scotland. He expanded the Ellison estate, further, with shipbuilding, and in 200 years of industrialisation, Hebburn grew into a modern town of 20,000 inhabitants. When the railways arrived in Hebburn in 1872, further growth took off in the Ellison estate, with the growth of the brick, metal and chemical industries.

Andrew Leslie's shipyard launched two hundred and fifty-five ships before 1885. In 1885 the shipyard merged with local locomotive builder W Hawthorne, and then changed its name to Hawthorn Leslie and Company, and grew even more.

Hebburn also hosted its own Highland Games, with the first one being held in 1883, which were usually held annually in July or August, spanning over three decades and with professional sportsmen coming from Scotland and as far as Oban to compete.

In 1894 Hebburn was recognised as its own independent Urban District; it was no longer the private land of the Ellison family; and it also adopted the Ellison family crest as its coat of arms.

In 1901 Alphonse Reyrolle's, Reyrolle Electrical Switchgear Company opened. In 1932 Hebburn colliery closed. 200 miners were killed during the life of the colliery. The youngest were 10 years old. In 1936 Monkton Coke Works was built by the Government, in response to the Jarrow Hunger March in 1932.

In the Second World War, the Battle of Britain occurred in 1940 and Hitler had planned an amphibious attack that was predicated on defeating the RAF in the battle. Hitler's planned first wave of attack, in his Operation Sea Lion plan, was to try and capture Aberdeen and Newcastle. Hitler's Operation Sea Lion documents had detailed plans to capture the Reyrolle Electrical Switchgear Company.

Hawthorn Leslie built everything from liners to tankers. Many Royal Navy battleships were built at Hawthorn Leslie shipyard. In WWII the yard built 41 naval vessels and repaired another 120. 1n 1944, the yard also built D-day landing craft, including the Landing Craft Tank (LCT) 7074. In April 2020, the craft was housed in the D-Day Story museum. In 2020, the boat was only one of ten craft of its kind to survive postwar. 

One ship built at the shipyard was HMS Kelly, launched in 1938 and commanded by Lord Louis Mountbatten. The ship, a K-Class destroyer, was commissioned just eleven days before WWII. The ship was hit three times. In December 1939, she was damaged by a German mine not far from the river Tyne. On 9 May 1940, she was torpedoed off Norway with the loss of 27 lives. Badly damaged, she crawled back to Hawthorn Leslie on a 92-hour journey to be repaired. In 1941, HMS Kelly was sunk off Crete. One hundred and thirty men were killed in the disaster and they are remembered in memorials at Hebburn Cemetery, which were erected by surviving members of the crew and workers from Hawthorn Leslie. The ship's story forms the basis of the 1942 film In Which We Serve. The shipyard is now owned by A&P Group but lies vacant.

The Monkton Coke Works plant closed in 1990, and was demolished in 1992. The former British Short-Circuit Testing Station in Victoria Road West within the town, owned by A. Reyrolle & Company provided the backdrop for the Gary Numan video "Metal". The facility was demolished in 2011.

In 2012, the BBC commissioned a television series Hebburn to be set in the town. It was created and co-written by Jason Cook, who was raised in Hebburn. The first episode was broadcast on 18 October 2012.

4th Battalion the Parachute Regiment and 23 SAS Reserves have bases in Hebburn.  The Air Cadets have a unit located at Hebburn TA Centre.

Hebburn has an ecology centre powered by wind turbines. It is the location of a shipyard, operated by A&P Group.

Education
Hebburn has two secondary schools St Joseph's Catholic Academy (formerly St Joseph's Comprehensive School) and Hebburn Comprehensive School.

Sport
Hebburn Town F.C., formed in 1912, and Hebburn Reyrolle F.C. are the town's local non-league football teams. Hebburn Argyle, which existed in the early 1900s, reformed several years ago as a youth club.

Athletics is also catered for at Monkton Stadium, home of Jarrow and Hebburn Athletic Club, where Brendan Foster, Steve Cram and David Sharpe are notable past runners.

A short lived greyhound racing track was opened in 1945. The plans to build the track were passed in September 1944 and it cost £30,000 to construct a venue that could accommodate 6,000 people. The racing was independent (not affiliated to the sports governing body the National Greyhound Racing Club) and was known as a flapping track, which was the nickname given to independent tracks. The track was trading in 1947 but it is not known when it closed.

Transport
It has a station on the Tyne and Wear Metro called Hebburn Metro station. Frequent bus services to South Shields, Jarrow, Gateshead and Newcastle are available to catch on Station Road.

Hebburn once operated a mid Tyne ferry service. The service was owned by various Tyne shipyards. The service ran between Hebburn, Walker and Wallsend. The ferry service last operated in 1986. One of the fleet, ran by the Mid Tyne Ferry Co, was called the Tyne Queen. In 2020 she was called the Jacobite Queen, and she was still working on Loch Ness, Inverness, Scotland.

Notable people

Academia
 Dominic Bruce, RAF officer and later a college principal who in WWII, escaped from Colditz Castle and Schloss Spangenberg
 John Miles (musician) Songwriter
 Arthur Holmes, geologist
 Brian David Smith, academic researcher
 John Steven Watson, English historian
 Paul Younger, hydrogeologist and environmental engineer

Engineering
 Andrew Leslie, shipbuilder

Entertainment
 Jason Cook, comedian, writer of the BBC sitcom Hebburn
 Robert Saint, composer, best known for his musical composition "Gresford", also known as "The Miners Hymn"
 Frank Wappat, BBC Radio presenter and disc jockey, founder of Memory Lane magazine

Politics
 Sir Fergus Montgomery, Conservative MP and Margaret Thatcher's Parliamentary Private Secretary (prior to her becoming Prime Minister)

Sport
 George Armstrong, football player with Arsenal F.C.
 Chris Basham, football player with Blackpool F.C., Bolton Wanderers F.C and Sheffield United F.C
 Ian Chipchase, athlete and gold medalist at the 1974 Commonwealth Games
 Josef Craig, British Paralympic swimmer, who won Gold at the 2012 Paralympic Games
 Johnny Dixon, football player with Aston Villa F.C.
 Jack English, football player
 Carl Finnigan, football player with St Johnstone F.C, Falkirk F.C., South Shields F.C and Newcastle United F.C
 Brendan Foster, athlete and sports commentator
 Wilfred Milne, football player
 Ray Wood, football player with Manchester United F.C.

References

Bibliography
James, Mervyn (1974) Family, Lineage, and Civil Society: A Study of Society, Politics, and Mentality in the Durham Region, 1500-1640 (Oxford: Oxford University Press).

External links

South Tyneside Council & Community website - Local council website
Hebburn Colliery - Information about Hebburn Colliery
Hebburn.org - Site detailing history of the town

Towns in Tyne and Wear
Unparished areas in Tyne and Wear
Metropolitan Borough of South Tyneside